Viola Wächter (born 7 February 1987) is a German judoka.

She is the bronze medallist of the 2017 Judo Grand Prix Hohhot in the -57 kg category.

References

External links
 

1987 births
Living people
German female judoka
European Games silver medalists for Germany
European Games medalists in judo
Judoka at the 2015 European Games
21st-century German women